Ctenostoma is a genus of beetles in the family Cicindelidae. The genus contains the following species:

 Ctenostoma abbreviatum Naviaux, 1998
 Ctenostoma acciavattii Naviaux, 1998
 Ctenostoma aeneum Naviaux, 1998
 Ctenostoma agnatum Chaudoir, 1860
 Ctenostoma albofasciatum Chaudoir, 1860
 Ctenostoma angustobliquatum W. Horn, 1924
 Ctenostoma arnaudi Naviaux, 1998
 Ctenostoma asperulum Bates, 1868
 Ctenostoma bahiaensis Naviaux, 1998
 Ctenostoma batesi Chaudoir, 1860
 Ctenostoma bicristatum Chaudoir, 1860
 Ctenostoma bifasciatum Dejean, 1831
 Ctenostoma bondari W. Horn, 1938
 Ctenostoma brendelli Naviaux, 1998
 Ctenostoma brevicorne W. Horn, 1898
 Ctenostoma brevilabre W. Horn, 1931
 Ctenostoma breviusculum Mannerheim, 1837
 Ctenostoma brunneum Naviaux, 1998
 Ctenostoma cassolai Naviaux, 1998
 Ctenostoma chaudoiri (W. Horn, 1895)
 Ctenostoma compactum Naviaux, 1998
 Ctenostoma coracinum Naviaux, 1998
 Ctenostoma corculum Bates, 1868
 Ctenostoma crucifrons W. Horn, 1911
 Ctenostoma crudelum Naviaux & Schule, 2008
 Ctenostoma cylindratum Naviaux, 1998
 Ctenostoma davidsoni Naviaux, 1998
 Ctenostoma dentifrons W. Horn, 1901
 Ctenostoma deuvei Naviaux, 1998
 Ctenostoma dokhtourowi W. Horn, 1898
 Ctenostoma dormeri W. Horn, 1898
 Ctenostoma durantoni Naviaux, 1998
 Ctenostoma ebeninum Bates, 1868
 Ctenostoma eburatum Bates, 1872
 Ctenostoma ecuadoriensis Naviaux, 1998
 Ctenostoma erwini Naviaux, 1998
 Ctenostoma ferum Naviaux, 2005
 Ctenostoma flexuosum Naviaux, 1998
 Ctenostoma formicarium (Fabricius, 1801)
 Ctenostoma fryi Chaudoir, 1865
 Ctenostoma gautardi Chaudoir, 1869
 Ctenostoma germaini W. Horn, 1902
 Ctenostoma globifrons W. Horn, 1898
 Ctenostoma guatemalensis Van Nidek, 1960
 Ctenostoma heydeni W. Horn, 1894
 Ctenostoma hirsutum W. Horn, 1892
 Ctenostoma hovorei Naviaux, 2005
 Ctenostoma ibidion Dohrn, 1889
 Ctenostoma ichneumoneum Dejean, 1826
 Ctenostoma immaculatum W. Horn, 1925
 Ctenostoma inca Naviaux, 1998
 Ctenostoma infimum Naviaux, 1998
 Ctenostoma insigne Chaudoir, 1860
 Ctenostoma intermedium Naviaux, 1998
 Ctenostoma jekeli Chevrolat, 1858
 Ctenostoma jonhsoni Naviaux, 1998
 Ctenostoma klugeanum W. Horn, 1915
 Ctenostoma laeticolor Bates, 1878
 Ctenostoma landolti Steinheil, 1877
 Ctenostoma longipalpe Naviaux, 1998
 Ctenostoma luctuosum Chaudoir, 1860
 Ctenostoma luteum Naviaux, 1998
 Ctenostoma macilentum Klug, 1834
 Ctenostoma maculicorne (Chevrolat, 1856)
 Ctenostoma maculosum Naviaux, 1998
 Ctenostoma magnum Naviaux, 1998
 Ctenostoma metallicum Castelnau, 1834
 Ctenostoma minimum Naviaux, 1998
 Ctenostoma minusculum Naviaux, 2002
 Ctenostoma modicum Naviaux, 1998
 Ctenostoma monnei Naviaux, 2002
 Ctenostoma nigrum Chaudoir, 1860
 Ctenostoma nitidum Naviaux, 1998
 Ctenostoma obliquatum Chaudoir, 1860
 Ctenostoma oblitum Chaudoir, 1865
 Ctenostoma onorei Naviaux, 1998
 Ctenostoma ornatum Klug, 1834
 Ctenostoma panamensis Naviaux, 2005
 Ctenostoma parallelum Naviaux, 1998
 Ctenostoma parvulum Naviaux, 1998
 Ctenostoma pearsoni Naviaux, 1998
 Ctenostoma plicaticolle W. Horn, 1911
 Ctenostoma pusillum Naviaux, 1998
 Ctenostoma pygnaeum (Lacordaire, 1843)
 Ctenostoma rapillyi Naviaux, 1998
 Ctenostoma regium Naviaux, 1998
 Ctenostoma rivalieri Naviaux, 1998
 Ctenostoma rugicolle W. Horn, 1904
 Ctenostoma rugiferum (W. Horn, 1895)
 Ctenostoma rugosum Klug, 1824
 Ctenostoma sahlbergi Chaudoir, 1860
 Ctenostoma sallei Chaudoir, 1860
 Ctenostoma schaumi W. Horn, 1895
 Ctenostoma schmalzi W. Horn, 1898
 Ctenostoma simile Naviaux, 1998
 Ctenostoma simpliceps W. Horn, 1900
 Ctenostoma spinosum Naviaux, 1998
 Ctenostoma subtilesculptum W. Horn, 1913
 Ctenostoma succinctum (Castelnau, 1834)
 Ctenostoma sumlini Naviaux, 1998
 Ctenostoma transversum Naviaux, 1998
 Ctenostoma trinotatum (Fischer, 1821)
 Ctenostoma tumidum Naviaux, 1998
 Ctenostoma turnbowi Naviaux, 1998
 Ctenostoma tyrannum (Thomson, 1859)
 Ctenostoma unifasciatum Dejean, 1831
 Ctenostoma vairai Cassola, 2000
 Ctenostoma vicinum Naviaux, 1998
 Ctenostoma wappesi Naviaux, 199
 Ctenostoma wiesneri Naviaux, 1998
 Ctenostoma zerchei Naviaux, 1998
 Ctenostoma zikani W. Horn, 1911
 Ctenostoma zonatum Chaudoir, 1860

References

Cicindelidae